Lidiya Nikolayevna Alfeyeva (17 January 1946 – 18 April 2022) was a Soviet athlete who mainly competed in the women's long jump event during her career.

Alfeyeva trained at the Armed Forces sports society in Moscow. She competed for the USSR in the 1976 Summer Olympics held in Montreal, Quebec, Canada where she won the bronze medal in the women's long jump event.

References

External links

1946 births
2022 deaths
Ukrainian female long jumpers
Soviet female long jumpers
Olympic bronze medalists for the Soviet Union
Athletes (track and field) at the 1976 Summer Olympics
Athletes (track and field) at the 1980 Summer Olympics
Olympic athletes of the Soviet Union
Armed Forces sports society athletes
Sportspeople from Dnipro
Medalists at the 1976 Summer Olympics
Olympic bronze medalists in athletics (track and field)
Recipients of the Order of Honour (Russia)